Samer is a commune and in the Pas-de-Calais department in the Hauts-de-France region of France.

Population

Places of interest
 The church of St.Martin, dating from the 15th century.
 The château du Grand-Molinet, dating from the 18th century.
 The ruins of an abbey, dating from the 15th century.
 Two museums, of art and of natural history.
 The de la Vienne farmhouse (1700).

Notable people
 Saint Vulmar, hermit who founded Samer Abbey in the 6th century. "Samer" may be a corruption of his name.
Eustace the Monk (c. 1170-1217), pirate and mercenary, was a Benedictine monk at Samer Abbey
Jean Mouton (c. 1459-30 October 1522) was a French composer of the Renaissance.
Jean-Charles Cazin (1840-1901), French landscape painter, son of a well-known doctor, FJ Cazin (1788-1864), was born at Samer.

See also
Communes of the Pas-de-Calais department

References

External links

 Official town web site 

Communes of Pas-de-Calais